High Hills of Santee Baptist Church is an historic Southern Baptist church located in the High Hills of Santee in Stateburg, near Dalzell in Sumter County, South Carolina. Its congregation was founded in 1772 and the present church was built in 1848.
Its first pastor was Richard Furman, who went on to become one of South Carolina's most influential ministers.  Furman University was named for him. Many of the Baptist churches in the area are offshoots of this church.

High Hills of Santee Baptist Church is a contributing property in the Stateburg Historic District, which was listed on the National Register of Historic Places on February 24, 1971.

High Hills Baptist Church is a member of the Santee Baptist Association.

Gallery

References

External links 
 Santee Baptist Association directory
 Historic American Buildings Survey for High Hills of Santee Baptist Church
 Blog with pictures and text on visit to High Hills Baptist Church
 History of Sumter
 History of Church
 Photos of church in 1934
 City of Sumter heritage and history listing for High Hills of Santee Baptist Church
 High Hill Baptist Church Retains Old-Time Atmosphere, Cotton Boll Conspiracy, May 15, 2016

High Hills of Santee
Baptist churches in South Carolina
Churches in Sumter County, South Carolina
Historic district contributing properties in South Carolina
Churches completed in 1803
National Register of Historic Places in Sumter County, South Carolina
Churches on the National Register of Historic Places in South Carolina